Ron Hornaday III (born August 1, 1979) is a NASCAR driver and the son of NASCAR Camping World Truck Series champion Ron Hornaday Jr. On May 12, 2001, he earned a career best finish of 11th at Darlington Raceway, his best out of 12 starts.

Motorsports career results

NASCAR
(key) (Bold – Pole position awarded by qualifying time. Italics – Pole position earned by points standings or practice time. * – Most laps led.)

Busch Series

Craftsman Truck Series

ARCA Re/Max Series
(key) (Bold – Pole position awarded by qualifying time. Italics – Pole position earned by points standings or practice time. * – Most laps led.)

References

External links
 

Living people 
1979 births
People from Palmdale, California
Racing drivers from California
NASCAR drivers
Sportspeople from Los Angeles County, California
ARCA Menards Series drivers